Keith Scott (born 28 October 1953) is an Australian voice actor, comedian, impressionist and animation historian.

Career
At a young age, Scott was always enchanted by the mimics and impressionists on The Ed Sullivan Show. He began developing his ability to impersonate voices in high school, doing cartoon characters (the first of which being Mr. Jinks) and teacher's voices. In October 1972, just after leaving school, Scott was hired by William Hanna, the head of Hanna-Barbera, which had established a large animation studio in Sydney, Australia. He got the gig when he brought in some letters that he had received from Daws Butler (voice of Yogi Bear, Huckleberry Hound, etc.) in December 1970. Hanna gave him a letter of recommendation when he was retrenched from the H-B office, and his name was such a credible one that it got Scott an instant agent, and his voice-over career began. In 1974, Scott began doing either impersonations or original character voices in many anonymous radio and TV commercials, and was promoted at Sydney clubs as "the Voice of 1000 Commercials".

He also made many appearances on TV shows as a comic impressionist, including Hey Hey It's Saturday and The Midday Show, and has provided voices for various Australian animations, including Yoram Gross's Dot feature films, Blinky Bill (he also sang the original version of the theme song for the first season), Tabaluga, Skippy: Adventures in Bushtown and Flipper and Lopaka. In the case of Yoram Gross' productions, Scott began working for Gross in 1984 and usually provided all of the male character voices. Across Australia he can be heard on some fifty radio stations, skewering the reputations of media and political types in How Green Was My Cactus.

Scott became internationally famous for his expert "matching" of cartoon characters. In July 1990, he was appointed an official licensed voice of Warner Bros' Looney Tunes characters for Australia, following the death of Mel Blanc in 1989, and since then he did Bugs Bunny, Daffy Duck, Tweety, Sylvester and the rest for countless animated TV commercials, live shows and promos for Warner Bros. Movie World, Westfield, KFC etc. Scott had met Blanc in May 1985 taping some impersonations for the Triple M network and trading blows with their voice impressions; he did Elmer Fudd and Jack Benny, while Blanc did Bugs and Sy the Mexican. He was also approved by Hanna-Barbera to do the voices of Fred Flintstone, Yogi Bear and others.

Scott was a long-time friend of Bill Scott (no relation) and Jay Ward (whom Scott had met in 1973), and is an expert on the history of Jay Ward Productions, authoring the book The Moose That Roared: The Story of Jay Ward, Bill Scott, a Flying Squirrel, and a Talking Moose (St. Martin's Press, 2000. ). He has also spent years studying the work of early voice actors, trying to identify performers who originally went uncredited in cartoons.

In 1991, a couple of years after Ward died in 1989, his daughter Tiffany took over his company and began revitalizing The Adventures of Rocky and Bullwinkle and Friends characters. At that time Scott had made a tape of all the imitations of Bullwinkle J. Moose, Boris Badenov, Dudley Do-Right and a lot of the supporting characters in March of that year. Tiffany got a copy of the tape from June Foray (voice of Rocky the Flying Squirrel). Once Tiffany heard the tape, she realized that Scott had obviously studied it for years, so she and Ward's wife Ramona appointed him the official voices in 1992. Scott did the voice of the narrator in George of the Jungle and George of the Jungle 2, and provided the voices for Bullwinkle, Boris, Fearless Leader, The Narrator and the RBTV Announcer in the 2000 motion picture The Adventures of Rocky and Bullwinkle (for which he had been specially flown to the United States several times). Also in 2000, Scott was originally cast as the voice of Diesel 10 in Thomas and the Magic Railroad, but he was removed from the film afterwards because the US test audiences thought that Scott made Diesel 10 sound much too frightening for young children. However, his voice for Diesel 10 can still be heard in early UK and US trailers of the film. Apart from originally meant to be voicing Diesel 10, he also narrated the Thomas the Tank Engine and Friends toy merchandise commercials from Bluebird Toys in Australia in 1998.

Filmography

Film

Television

Shorts

Video games

Theme park attractions

Commercials

Radio

Discography

Live-action

Awards

Mo Awards
The Australian Entertainment Mo Awards (commonly known informally as the Mo Awards), were annual Australian entertainment industry awards. They recognise achievements in live entertainment in Australia from 1975 to 2016. Keith Scott won three awards in that time.
 (wins only)
|-
| 1978
| Keith Scott
| Johnny O'Keefe Encouragement Award 
| 
|-
| 2010
| Keith Scott
| Comedy Act of the Year
| 
|-
| 2011
| Keith Scott
| Comedy Act of the Year
| 
|-

References

External links
 Official Home Page
 

1953 births
Living people
20th-century Australian comedians
20th-century Australian male actors
21st-century Australian comedians
21st-century Australian male actors
Australian comedians
Australian impressionists (entertainers)
Australian male video game actors
Australian male voice actors
Blinky Bill
Historians of animation